Hannes Fuchs (born March 9, 1972) is a retired male badminton player from Austria.

Career
Fuchs competed in badminton at the 1992 Summer Olympics in men's singles. He lost in the second round to Deepankar Bhattacharya, of India, 8-15, 15-11, 15-11. He also played in men's doubles with Jürgen Koch and they were beaten in the first round.

In 1993 he won the Russian Open, the Slovenian International and the Bulgarian International, and in 1994 the Bulgarian International again. He also competed at the 1996 Summer Olympics.

References

Austrian male badminton players
Badminton players at the 1992 Summer Olympics
Badminton players at the 1996 Summer Olympics
Olympic badminton players of Austria
1972 births
Living people